3rd Night is an Australian horror film directed and written by Adam Graveley and starring Jesse McGinn, Robert Hartburn, and Bruce Denny.

Plot

Cast
Jesse McGinn as Meagan Reid
Robert Hartburn as Jonathan Reid
Bruce Denny as Cambo
Connor Gosatti as Rex
Rose McKenna as Deidre Bodeen

Production
Filmed at Longvalley Orchard in Jarrahdale, Western Australia.

References

External links 

Official website

2017 films
2017 horror films
Australian horror films
2010s English-language films
2010s Australian films